Krun or Akrun is a Mandaean lord of the underworld. According to Mandaean cosmology, he dwells in the lowest depths of creation, supporting the entirety of the physical world.

In mythology 
Krun is the greatest of the five Mandaean lords of the underworld, the others being Shdum, Hag, Gaf, and Zartai-Zartanai, according to the 5th book of the right half of the Great Treasure (Ginza Rabba) of the Mandaeans, their most sacred text.

He is represented by the image of a lion on the skandola talisman, which is used to seal the graves of the newly dead. The epithet most frequently associated with him is ṭura rba ḏ-bisra, "the great mountain of flesh."

In astronomy 

The Mandaean community of Iraq and Iran is one of the few communities from the Middle East that still preserve the ancient Babylonian tradition of divination by the stars and heavenly bodies (astrology), directly from its source, even retaining the traditional Akkadian names for the stars and the visible planets. Despite this unique distinction, the Mandaeans had previously been unrepresented in astronomical place-names.

Starting March 20, 2015, the Search for Extraterrestrial Life solicited names, and votes on names, from the interested public for the features of Pluto and its satellites, which had yet to be documented. Rutgers professor Charles G. Häberl initiated a social media campaign, "Vote Krun," to recognize the Mandaeans by bestowing a Mandaic name upon one such feature. The Vote Krun campaign noted that since the time of Percival Lowell and Clyde Tombaugh,
heavenly cosmography had expanded beyond names from Greco-Roman antiquity to the celebrated figures of many cultures and traditions, but not yet
the Mandaeans.

A dark region along the equator of the dwarf planet Pluto, immediately to the right of the large bright feature Tombaugh Regio, has been named "Krun Macula" by NASA scientists. In real-color images, Krun Macula appears as a dark red patch.

See also 
Genzā Rabbā
Ruha, the queen of the underworld in Mandaeism

Notes

Sources

Demons in Mandaeism
Giants